Ekaitz Saies (born 2 March 1982 in Donostia) is a Spanish sprint canoer who has been competing since the late 2000s. He won a gold medal in the K-1 4 × 200 m event at the 2009 ICF Canoe Sprint World Championships in Dartmouth, Nova Scotia, Canada.

References
 Canoe09.ca profile

Living people
Spanish male canoeists
Sportspeople from San Sebastián
1982 births
ICF Canoe Sprint World Championships medalists in kayak
Canoeists from the Basque Country (autonomous community)